Akkavuk Mosque is a mosque without a minaret in the Akkavuk quarter of Nicosia, currently located in North Nicosia. The mosque was built in 1902, On the site of what appeared to be a small medieval chapel or church. A smaller mosque on the site had been built in 1895. The apse of the original building with a moulded arched window of 16th-century style survived, but all such traces have now been removed.

The mosque is made of cut stone (ashlar) and has a rectangular layout. It has three sharp arches in the front façade, and the space between the arches have been covered by glass in a renovation. On the southern wall at opposite of the entrance, there is a mihrab and a nearby wooden mimbar. The masjid also had a fountain during the British rule.

The mosque has an area of 132 m2 and can hold 188 worshipers.

References 

Mosques in Nicosia
Mosques completed in 1902